Retford railway station is on the East Coast Main Line in the United Kingdom, serving the town of Retford, Nottinghamshire. It has four platforms, two of which serve the main line and the other two, located at a lower level and at right angles to the first pair, serve the Sheffield to Lincoln Line.

Facilities

The higher-level platforms (numbered 1 and 2) respectively serve southbound and northbound East Coast Main Line trains operated by London North Eastern Railway which call at Retford. Platform 1 (on the eastern side of the layout) adjoins the main station building. Between the two platforms tracks there are two further lines, used by fast trains not booked to call here.

The station is staffed throughout the week, with most amenities (booking office, toilets, coffee shop and vending machine) in the main building on platforms 1.  The ticket office is staffed Monday - Friday 05:35 - 18:00, Saturday 05:35 - 16:10 and Sunday 08:20 - 16:10.  A self-service ticket machine is also provided for use when the booking office is closed and for collecting pre-paid tickets.  Train running information is offered via automated announcements, CIS displays and timetable posters.  There are also customer help points on both low-level platforms, along with waiting shelters.  All platforms are fully accessible for disabled passengers via lifts and a subway.

Services

East Coast Main Line

The station's High Level platforms are located on the East Coast Main Line and are served by London North Eastern Railway and Hull Trains services which are operated using Class 800 and 802 Bi-Mode units and Class 801 EMUs.

On weekends, the frequency is the same although services usually run to Edinburgh or Leeds.

There are seven trains to London and Hull on weekdays of which two continue to Beverley with a reduced service in place on weekends.

Low-level

The station's low level platforms are located on the Sheffield to Lincoln Line and are served by Northern Trains services which are operated  using  and  DMUs.

In May 2019, significant improvements were made on the line as part of the new Northern franchise with services on the line being doubled, although these have since been reduced due to the COVID-19 pandemic.

The typical off-peak service in trains per hour is:
 1 tph to  via 
 1 tph to 

A small number of trains from Sheffield start/terminate here, including two that use the surviving connection via Whisker Hill Junction to reach platform 2 at High Level (a practice that was much more common in the 1970s when the Lincoln route had fewer through trains).

In 2021, work was undertaken to make the low-level platforms fully accessible, funded by the UK Government's Access for All programme. Previously, only the Retford to Lincoln platform (platform 4) was accessible; the Retford to Sheffield platform (platform 3) had steps to the platform and a barrow crossing. It was originally intended that the improvement programme would be completed by July 2021, but the project was set back by flooding and finally concluded on 15 December. The programme included the addition of a covered walkway between the mainline platforms and the low-level platforms.

History

Retford station was Grade II listed by Historic England in July 2020. The current buildings date from 1891-2 and the reason for listing was given as "the very rare survival of the original finishes in the dining room and refreshment room" which are said to be ornate and featuring "fine craftsmanship"; the "remarkably long and well-balanced composition in the Italianate style" of the station buildings and the "impressive" canopy over the platform; and the well-preserved platform which make it "one of the most intact medium-sized GNR stations".

The Retford Times (1913) presents a memoir of William Briggs (b 1839) who recalled the arrival of the first locomotive: "The speculation and guesses as to what a steam train would be like, when it began to be talked about, was general.  The first locomotive came on a heavy lorry.  It arrived on a Saturday, and going down Dixon's Bridge, the weight sunk the wheels on one side to the axle, and it had to remain till Monday.  On Sunday hundreds visited the spot." He also recalled a train going to Cleethorpes from Manchester and Sheffield which had 64 carriages, all full, and many of them open to the weather.

'The Retford Times also published the memories of Frank George (b 1879) who worked at WH Smith & Sons railway station bookstall. He recalled that "the Duke and Duchess of Portland, Duke and Duchess of Newcastle, Earl and Countess Manvers, Earl and Countess of Yarborough, the Earl and Countess of Galway, the Foljambes, Laycocks, Denisons, Huntsmans etc" all used the station. The Duchess of Newcastle was said to change at Retford accompanied by her Russian Borzoi hounds. "If any special guests were staying at Welbeck Abbey, a magnificent equipage would bring them to Retford station, cockaded footmen and coachmen and occasionally postillion riders, a wonderful experience for any lad."

Historic station buildings

S&LJR line and Thrumpton Station

The first railway into Retford was the Sheffield and Lincolnshire Junction Railway which opened on 16 July 1849 on the line between Sheffield (Bridgehouses) and Gainsborough. The station for this line was at Thrumpton, part  of which still survives and is called The Old Station House.

The Great Northern Railway

The Great Northern Railway line from Doncaster arrived on 4 September 1849 crossing the S&LJR on the level. Several new streets were built at this time to link the station to the existing town, including Queen Street, Victoria Road, Station Road and Albert Road. On 1 July 1859, the S&LJR  (now the Manchester, Sheffield & Lincolnshire Railway) began using the GNR station via a short connecting curve and closed its original station.

The original layout

Prior to the remodelling of the station, the S&LJR and GNR lines crossed at a flat crossing with a curve connecting the northern and eastern tracks. This allowed trains on the Sheffield-Gainsborough line to call at the station. 

There were two northbound platforms - platform 2 (now closed) was on the eastern side of an island platform and platform 3 on the opposite side (still in use, now renumbered 2). Platform 1 handled southbound and eastbound trains. In addition, there was a single southbound line which passed in between platforms 1 and 2, rather than the two lines in place today. To relieve congestion on platform 1, there was a timber-built extension on the south curve (platform 1A) to allow Lincoln-bound trains to clear platform 1 proper.

1960s change of layout
The lower-level platforms (originally numbered 4 and 5, now re-numbered 3 and 4) were added when the flat crossing between the two lines was removed and replaced with a bridge in 1965 and the Sheffield-Gainsborough tracks lowered to pass beneath the main line. 

These works also necessitated the removal of the direct north-to-east curve, meaning that trains between Sheffield and Lincoln could no longer call at the original platforms without a reversal.
The curve connecting the Sheffield to Lincoln line to the current Platform 2 still exists and is used by a limited number of trains each day.

Use of station buildings

Canteen and Rest Room

The work of the WVS of Retford at the station is celebrated with a plaque on Platform 1, which states that between March 1940 and March 1946 they served 2,284,000 meals to HM and Allied Forces in the canteen and rest room.

Buffet and First Class Dining Room

The former Buffet and First Class Dining room on platform 1 are currently used as clubrooms by the Bassetlaw (North Notts) Railway Society. The club has installed an interesting display of local railway images in the windows of the rooms.

Great North of England Cattle Market

The Great Northern and the Manchester, Sheffield and Lincolnshire Railway Companies put forward the idea of a ‘Great North of England Cattle Market’ next to the railway. By 1865, the Retford Cattle  Company was holding markets on a site to the east of West Carr Road and north of the railway line. There was a public house next to this known as The Cattle Market or Market Hotel (building still exists).

Accidents and incidents
On 13 February 1923 - an express passenger train overran signals and was in a rear-end collision with a goods train. Three people were killed.
 13 August 2014 - man was killed after being struck by a train.
21 February 2019 - a 45-year-old woman died after being struck by a train in Retford.

References in popular culture
Bill Bryson comments of Retford station, in his book Notes from a Small Island, that it is shown on railway maps in a typeface (and large filled circle graphic) marking it as equivalent to much more notable cities in northern England, and he therefore deemed it worth a visit.

Michael Palin of Monty Python fame recalls frequently visiting Retford station as a youngster for train spotting, as it was in easy reach of his home city of Sheffield and provided access to legendary locomotives like the Flying Scotsman running on the East Coast Main Line.

See also
Listed buildings in Retford

References

 Dow, G., (1959) Great Central, Volume One: The Progenitors (1813-1863) , Shepperton: Ian Allan Ltd.

External links

Railway stations in Nottinghamshire
DfT Category C2 stations
Former Great Northern Railway stations
Railway stations in Great Britain opened in 1849
Railway stations served by Hull Trains
Northern franchise railway stations
Railway stations served by London North Eastern Railway
Retford
1849 establishments in England